Abercynon North railway station was one of two railway stations - North and South - serving the village of Abercynon in the Cynon Valley, Wales. It was located on the Aberdare branch of the Merthyr Line 15¼ miles (24 km) north of Cardiff Central. Passenger services were provided by Arriva Trains Wales.

History
The station was opened by the British Railways Board on 3 October 1988.  It was constructed to allow the Aberdare line to serve Abercynon village, as the track layout in use at the time at the original station did not allow Aberdare services to call there.

In November 2007 a proposal was submitted by the Welsh Assembly Government to discontinue all services provided at this station. From a date "no sooner than 1st May 2008" as the notice runs, all services were to be transferred to Abercynon South, which will be rebuilt to accommodate all services serving both stations.

At the end of May 2008 the island platform was reinstated at Abercynon South and the North station closed.

Services

Autumn 2007 

Abercynon North was served by a train every 30 minutes in each direction, weekday daytimes, calling at almost all stations between Aberdare and Barry Island via Llandaf.

References

Disused railway stations in Rhondda Cynon Taf
Railway stations opened by British Rail
Railway stations in Great Britain opened in 1988
Railway stations in Great Britain closed in 2008